The Evangelical Presbyterian Church in England and Wales (EPCEW) is a reformed and conservative evangelical Presbyterian denomination based in England and Wales with churches in Germany, Switzerland, and Sweden. Founded in 1996, the denomination is small but growing.

History 

In 1986, a Presbyterian conference was held in a Free Church of Scotland chapel in London, where a vision of a new Presbyterian denomination in England was proposed, which was to be faithful to Scripture and adhere to the Westminster Confession. As a consequence, the Presbyterian Association in England was formed in 1987 from several small Christian groups and existing congregations with efforts at church planting following. In 1991, an interim Presbytery was formed with congregations in Blackburn, Cambridge, Chelmsford, Durham and Hull to work towards the establishment of the new denomination. This came to fruition in 1996, taking the name, Evangelical Presbyterian Church in England and Wales.

Several EPCEW ministers were instrumental in the 2020 founding of Westminster Presbyterian Theological Seminary in Gateshead, England.

Church planting 
In 2000, two congregations in Cardiff, Immanuel and Bethel, were accepted into communion. The EPCEW has grown significantly since its founding with a number of congregations joining the EPCEW and others being planted by existing churches. In 2016 the denomination planted a church in the Salford/Manchester area and is working to establish church plants in Oxford, Lincoln, Gloucester, and Sunderland.  They are actively looking to plant churches throughout England and Wales.

Denominational growth has been steady:

Congregations 

As of 2020, the denomination has twenty-three congregations and church plants at:

England

Wales

Sweden

 Tranås, Sweden

Germany
 Berlin, Germany

Switzerland 

 Zurich, Switzerland

Publications

The denomination publishes The Presbyterian Network in Spring and Autumn with theological and pastoral articles and news from its congregations.

International organisations 

Along with the Free Church of Scotland and the Free Church of Scotland (Continuing), the denomination is one of the three members of the International Conference of Reformed Churches from Great Britain, and one of seven European Christian denominations who founded the European Conference of Reformed Churches.  The denomination has a co-operative agreement with the Presbyterian Church in America and maintains relations with the Evangelical Presbyterian Church in Northern Ireland.

References

External links 
Evangelical Presbyterian Church in England and Wales - Official Website

Christian organizations established in 1996
Religious organisations based in England
Religious organisations based in Wales
Presbyterian denominations in Europe
Presbyterian denominations established in the 20th century
Presbyterianism in the United Kingdom
Presbyterianism in England
Presbyterianism in Wales
Reformed denominations in the United Kingdom